Gumbo (Louisiana Creole: Gombo) is a soup popular in the U.S. state of Louisiana, and is the official state cuisine.  Gumbo consists primarily of a strongly flavored stock, meat or shellfish (or sometimes both), a thickener, and the Creole "holy trinity" ― celery, bell peppers, and onions. Gumbo is often categorized by the type of thickener used, whether okra or filé powder (dried and ground sassafras leaves).

Gumbo can be made with or without okra or filé powder. The preferred method in the historical New Orleans variation is with a French dark even chocolate-like roux. The flavor of the dish has its origins in many cultures.  Creole gumbo generally contains shellfish, and a dark roux, filé, or both. Today, tomatoes are occasionally found in Creole gumbo and frequently appear in New Orleans cuisine but many gumbo cooks believe that tomatoes should never be used in gumbo. Cajun gumbo is generally based on a dark roux and is made with shellfish or fowl. Sausage or ham is often added to gumbos of either variety. After the base is prepared, vegetables are cooked down, and then meat is added. The dish simmers for a minimum of three hours, with shellfish and some spices added near the end. If desired, filé powder is added after the pot is removed from heat. Gumbo is traditionally served with rice. A third, lesser-known variety, the meatless gumbo z'herbes, is essentially a gumbo of slow-cooked greens.

The dish combines ingredients and culinary practices of several cultures, including African, French, Spanish, and Native American Choctaw. Gumbo may have been based on traditional native dishes, or may be a derivation of the French dish bouillabaisse, or Choctaw stew, but most likely all of these dishes contributed to the original recipe. It was first described in 1802, and was listed in various cookbooks in the latter half of the 19th century. The dish gained more widespread popularity in the 1970s, after the United States Senate dining room added it to the menu in honor of Louisiana Senator Allen Ellender. The popularity of chef Paul Prudhomme in the 1980s spurred further interest in the dish.

Etymology
The name of the dish comes most likely from Africa by way of Louisiana French. Scholars and chefs have offered various explanations for the etymology of the word "gumbo". The dish was likely named after one of its two main ingredients, okra or filé. In the Niger–Congo languages spoken by many enslaved  people from West Africa, the vegetable okra was known as ki ngombo or quingombo; the word is akin to the Umbundu ochinggômbo and the Tshiluba chinggômbô "okra". In the language of the native Choctaw people, filé, or ground sassafras leaves, is called kombo.

Variations

Gumbo is a heavily seasoned stew that combines several varieties of meat or seafood with a sauce or gravy. Any combination of meat or seafood can be used.  Meat-based gumbo may consist of chicken, duck, squirrel, or rabbit, with oysters occasionally added. Seafood-based gumbo generally has shrimp, crab meat, and sometimes oysters.  Andouille sausage is often added to both meat and seafood gumbos to provide "piquancy, substance, and an additional layer of flavor" to the dish. The key is to use a tender andouille so it does not become too chewy."  Most varieties of gumbo are seasoned with onions, parsley, bell pepper, and celery.  Tomatoes are sometimes used in seafood gumbo, but traditionally few other vegetables are included.

Thickeners

Gumbo broth or gravy derives from three primary thickeners: okra, filé powder, and roux.  Traditionally, okra and filé powder are not used in the same dish, although this rule is sometimes broken.  Roux can be used alone or in conjunction with either of the other thickeners. Okra is more often used as a thickener in seafood gumbos than those with meat.  This mucilaginous vegetable is usually cooked first, and other ingredients added once the desired consistency is reached. According to The Oxford Companion to Food, okra-based gumbos are becoming less popular, as the okra texture has become less palatable to changing tastes.

Ground sassafras leaf, known as filé, is generally not added to the gravy until after the vegetables and meats or seafood have finished cooking and have been removed from the heat source.  If added during the boiling process, filé makes the gumbo too ropey; when added at the end, the gumbo gains a slightly stringy texture.

Roux has become the most popular thickener, made from cooking together a roughly equal proportion of flour and fat (traditionally hog lard, although increasingly made with butter since the mid-20th century). The length of cooking time determines the final flavor and texture, since the longer the roux is cooked before being added to the gumbo, the darker it becomes and the less thickening power it retains.  A very dark roux provides a much thinner sauce with a more intense flavor than a light roux.

Cajun vs. Creole gumbo

Gumbo is typically divided into two varieties. Combinations traditionally common in New Orleans and southeastern Louisiana are known as "Creole" after the Louisiana Creole people, descendants of the area's French, Spanish, and African immigrants. "Cajun" combinations were common in southwestern Louisiana, which was populated primarily by Cajuns, descendants of the French-speaking settlers expelled from Acadia (located within the modern-day Canadian provinces of Quebec, Nova Scotia, New Brunswick and Prince Edward Island) in the mid-18th century.

Gumbo is usually identified by its dark roux, cooked until it is a color "a few shades from burning". The roux is used with okra or filé powder.  Seafood is popular in gumbo the closer to the water the people are, but the southwestern areas of Louisiana often use fowl, such as chicken or duck, and sausage.  The fowl is generally not deboned, and onions, celery, and bell pepper are not strained out of the dish.  Cajun gumbo is usually topped with parsley and green onions.

Creole gumbo most often consists of seafood, tomatoes, and a thickener.  Before the latter half of the 20th century, celery was rarely used in Creole gumbo.

Gumbo z'herbes

When Catholics were expected to abstain from eating meat during Lent, a meatless variety of gumbo, known as gumbo z'herbes (from gumbo aux herbes, or "gumbo of greens"), was often served. This variety combined varied greens – typically including turnips, mustard greens, and spinach.  The greens were cooked to mush and strained through a sieve to produce a thick green liquid.  Preparation for this variety of gumbo was time-consuming, and as Lenten restrictions have relaxed, the dish has become less popular.  It is very rarely served in restaurants.  In modern times, ham or crabmeat is occasionally added to this type of gumbo.

Gumbo z'herbes may have originated with the French/Spanish/West Africans. It has similarities to the French dish potage aux herbes ("soup with greens"), as well as to the Afro-Caribbean callaloo. The meatless dish also bears striking resemblance to a dish often eaten in Germany on Maundy Thursday. German Catholics, obeying the Lenten rules, often served a stew made of seven different greens on this date.

History

Background
Gumbo is often used as a metaphor for the mix of cultures that exist in southern Louisiana.  The dish combines the culinary practices of Africans, Native Americans, French, and Spanish. In the 18th and 19th centuries, people from these cultures lived within a fairly small area with minimal mobility. In this environment, cultures could influence each other and meld to create new traditions and cuisine.

The establishment of Mobile in 1702 marked the beginning of the French colony of Louisiana. French settlers allied with various native tribes including the Choctaw, Alabama, and Cherokee, from whom they learned new methods of cooking and ways to identify edible indigenous plants.

Slave ships began arriving in Louisiana in 1719.  The first ships carried rice and men who were experienced in its cultivation.  The grain adapted well to its new environment, and within a few years, rice was commonly grown along the Mississippi River.

In 1721, 125 Germans settled  from New Orleans, and introduced the art of making sausage. By 1746, the white population of Louisiana was estimated to be 3,200, with an estimated 4,730 black people. Enslaved Africans outnumbered whites in most areas of Louisiana for at least the next 40 years.

The colony was transferred from French to Spanish control in 1762. The Spanish government actively recruited settlers for Spanish Louisiana. About 2,000 people from the Canary Islands moved to the area south of New Orleans.  These settlers were primarily fishermen who soon began supplying large amounts of shrimp, crab, and oysters to the food markets in New Orleans. The Canary Islanders also brought "a love for well-seasoned food", including use of ground cayenne pepper, a spicy hot red chili pepper. Spanish authorities also granted permission for many French-speaking Acadian exiles to relocate from northeastern North America to Louisiana. From 1755 through 1795, almost 3,000 of these settlers, soon known as Cajuns, moved to the areas south and west of New Orleans. Louisiana was secretly returned to France in 1800, then purchased by the United States in 1803. The southernmost part of territorial Louisiana, including New Orleans, became the state of Louisiana in 1812.

By 1800, the slave trade had introduced new foods to Louisiana, including the African vegetable okra, and hot pepper plants which likely came from Haiti. Onions and bell peppers were long part of cooking in both the Spanish and African traditions. Tomatoes were introduced to the region shortly thereafter.

Origin
Scholars agree that gumbo originated in Louisiana in the early 18th century, but its uncertain etymology makes it difficult to pinpoint the origins of the food. Although no conclusive evidence exists, cultural markers indicate several plausible scenarios.

As aforementioned, while its exact origins are unknown, gumbo is often believed to be a dish of mixed origins of French, Spanish, African, Native American, Caribbean and German influence. Enslaved African-Americans often exchanged or combined ingredients in order to make the dish, allowing it to serve as a means of community and identity.

West Africans used the vegetable okra as a base for many dishes, including soups. In Louisiana, gumbo includes ingredients introduced by several cultural groups. Surviving records indicate that by 1764 Africans in New Orleans mixed cooked okra with rice to make a meal.

Though highly unlikely, gumbo could be a derivation of traditional French soups, particularly the fish stew bouillabaisse. During the cold winters, Acadians generally cooked soups, using whatever ingredients were readily available. When the Acadians moved to Louisiana in the mid-18th century, they were unable to find many of their traditional ingredients, including turnips and cabbage. In this scenario, Acadian colonists substituted local ingredients for those commonly included in the original stew. Instead of the fish, settlers used shellfish. The dish was later modified to include ingredients common in other cultures.

Some culinary experts in the early 20th century, including Celestine Eustis, maintained that gumbo was an early special occasion dish for native tribes. This is further implied by a late 18th-century Cajun practice. At that time, rice was a luxury for many Cajuns. They served gumbo over corn grits, a pairing common in the stews of native tribes. The use of corn and filé powder may imply that the dish was derived from native cuisine.

These theories are intermixed in the local legend of the Frying Pan Revolt, or Petticoat Insurrection. According to legend, in 1722, female French colonists gathered in New Orleans at the home of Governor Jean-Baptiste Le Moyne, Sieur de Bienville, to protest the lack of familiar ingredients. Bienville's housekeeper, Madame Langlois, taught the women how to improve the basic gumbo. Langlois used okra, an ingredient which the women had previously been introduced to by the African people they were enslaving. Spanish and Choctaw introduced ingredients common in Choctaw cuisine – shrimp, crawfish, and filé powder.

Development
The first written references to gumbo appear in the early 19th century. In 1802, John Sibley described "the dish they call gumbo which is made principally of the ochre into a thick kind of soop  & eat with rice, it is the food of every body for dinner and supper." The following year, French governor Pierre Clement de Laussat hosted a soirée in which 24 different gumbos were prepared. According to author Cynthia Lejeune Nobles, these two events "give clues to gumbo's Spanish colonial popularity and illustrate that the dish could be both humble and refined".

An 1824 cookbook, Mary Randolph's The Virginia House-Wife, was the first to include a recipe for gumbo.  Called "Gumbo – A West India Dish", the simple recipe described how to boil okra and bore little resemblance to the stew commonly known as gumbo. The same book contained a recipe for "Ochra Soup" made with okra, onions, fowl, bacon, tomatoes, and lima beans thickened with flour. Although this recipe bore similarities to gumbo, it more closely resembled the Caribbean dish callaloo.

A more familiar version of the dish was described in an 1879 cookbook by Marion Cabell Tyree.  Her Housekeeping in Old Virginia described "Gumbo Filit A La Creole", a filé-based gumbo with chicken and oysters and spiced with allspice, cloves, red and black pepper, parsley, and thyme. The 1881 cookbook What Mrs. Fisher Knows About Old Southern Cooking, dictated by former slave Abby Fisher, contained three gumbo recipes. "Oyster Gumbo Soup" used a filé base, while "Ochra Gumbo" and "Chicken Gumbo" used okra as a base. Four years later, the cookbook La Cuisine Creole documented eight varieties of gumbo. None used sausage, but almost all of them contained ham.

Until the 1970s, gumbo was primarily popular on the Gulf Coast of the United States. It gained a broader profile after the death of United States Senator Allen Ellender. A native of Terrebonne Parish, Louisiana, Ellender had often cooked gumbo for his colleagues, including five American presidents. After Ellender died in 1972, the Senate directed that their cafeteria add Louisiana Creole Gumbo, made with seafood, to its menu in his honor. The dish became more widely popular in the 1980s, when chef Paul Prudhomme's popularity spurred interest in Creole and Cajun cooking.

Preparation and serving
Gumbo is cooked for a minimum of three hours, and often simmers all day. Meat (but not seafood) is often browned beforehand and removed from the heat. Okra and roux are cooked before other vegetables and seafood. Okra is removed from heat when it reaches the desired consistency, while roux remains in the pot. Seasoning vegetables are then added to the sauce. When these have turned to mush (more commonly called cooked down), the meat and okra are added to the pot along with water or stock, then boiled uncovered until the desired tenderness of the meat is reached. Seasonings, including red, black, and white pepper, bay leaves, thyme, hot sauce, and salt, are added to taste.  According to Nobles, "proper seasoning of gumbo is essential, and in Louisiana adding just the right zing is considered an art". Because seafood cooks fairly quickly, it is not added to the pot until the end of the process. As the gumbo finishes cooking, green onions and parsley are sometimes sprinkled on it. When desired, filé powder is added last.

Creole and Cajun gumbos are served with hot rice, which helps the dish to feed a larger number of people. Gumbo z'herbes is served with rice on the side. Gumbo is almost always served directly from the pot on the stove, although in wealthier or fancier homes the dish might be transferred to a tureen on the table. Often, gumbo and bread are the sole courses in a meal, although many Cajun families provide a side dish of potato salad. Occasionally, gumbo is served as part of a larger menu.

Soniat gives examples of the main types of creole gumbos, along with descriptions of family traditions about them.

Social aspects
In Cajun Foodways, C. Paige Gutierrez describes gumbo as "an economical dish" useful for "feed[ing] a large number of people with a small amount of meat or seafood".  Nobles concurs that "one of the hallmarks of gumbo is that, with a big enough pot, it can easily be doubled or tripled and is always a good choice to feed a crowd".  With this dish, cooks can use up small portions of various ingredients that were not sufficient for an individual meal.  The dish is an efficient way to use up leftover perishable meats and seafood. Gumbo, contrary to popular belief, is good for leftovers if it is frozen or refrigerated within two hours. Also, gumbo made without filé powder stores better because it will not get stringy.

Since the 19th century, gumbo has often been served at social gatherings or other special occasions in Louisiana.  Local fais do-do (dance parties) usually provided gumbo beginning at midnight.  Many families "have a gumbo", or host a casual social gathering where friends and family chat and enjoy alcoholic beverages and gumbo.

Gumbo is prepared and enjoyed by Louisianians of all races and ethnicities, and its multicultural influences have evolved it through the years. Gumbo is a feature in both urban and rural areas of Louisiana.

In rural Acadiana in southern Louisiana, gumbo is a central feature of Mardi Gras celebrations.  On Mardi Gras, local men wander from house to house and beg for gumbo ingredients in an event known as courir de Mardi Gras. Members of the local community then gather in a central location while the men cook the gumbo.  When it is ready, the group eats and dances until midnight, when Lent begins.

Gumbo is the official cuisine of the state of Louisiana. Many southern Louisiana cooking competitions center around gumbo, and it is a central feature of many local festivals. The self-described "Gumbo Capital of the World", Bridge City, Louisiana, holds an annual Gumbo Festival. More commonly, festival gumbo pots measure 2 ft (0.6 m) in depth and diameter.

See also

 Cuisine of New Orleans
 List of regional dishes of the United States
 List of stews

Further reading

References

Bibliography

External links

 Gumbo recipes from 1901; archive link
 What Mrs. Fisher Knows About Old Southern Cooking, Soups, Pickles, Preserves, Etc.

American rice dishes
American stews
Cajun cuisine
Cuisine of New Orleans
Louisiana cuisine
Christmas food
Okra dishes
Sausage dishes
Seafood dishes
Meat dishes
American cuisine